Vietnamese era names were titles adopted in historical Vietnam for the purpose of year identification and numbering.

Era names originated in 140 BCE in China, during the reign of the Emperor Wu of Han. Since the middle of the 6th century CE, independent Vietnamese dynasties started to proclaim their own era names.

During periods of direct Chinese rule, Chinese era names would gain official use in Vietnam, as was the case for other parts of China.

List of Vietnamese era names

The following is a list of era names adopted by independent Vietnamese monarchs. Era names used in Vietnam during the four periods of direct Chinese rule are not included.

Early Lý dynasty

Đinh dynasty

Early Lê dynasty

Lý dynasty

Trần dynasty

Other regimes contemporaneous with Trần dynasty

Hồ dynasty

Later Trần dynasty

Other regimes contemporaneous with Later Trần dynasty

Primitive Lê dynasty

Other regimes contemporaneous with Primitive Lê dynasty

Mạc dynasty

Revival Lê dynasty

Other regimes contemporaneous with Revival Lê dynasty

Tây Sơn dynasty

Nguyễn dynasty

Other regimes contemporaneous with Nguyễn dynasty

See also
 List of Vietnamese monarchs
 Family tree of Vietnamese monarchs

References

Notes

Bibliography
 
 
 
 
 

 
 
 Era name
Vietnam
Vietnam
Era name
Era name